Ved Prakash Solanki is an Indian politician formerly with the Indian National Congress party. Solanki was elected to Rajasthan Legislative Assembly in 2018 from Chaksu in Jaipur district on the INC ticket.

Political career 

Ved Prakash Solanki is an Indian politician with the Indian National Congress party and he was former Cricketer. Solanki was elected to Rajasthan Legislative Assembly in 2018 from Chaksu in Dausa parliamentary on the INC ticket.

References

External links 
 Ved Prakash Solanki on Twitter

People from Jaipur district
Rajasthani politicians
Rajasthan MLAs 2008–2013
Indian National Congress politicians
Living people
1960 births
Rajasthan MLAs 2018–2023
Indian National Congress politicians from Rajasthan